Warren Steinley  (born April 27, 1982) is a Canadian politician, who was elected Member of Parliament for the riding of Regina—Lewvan in the 2019 Canadian federal election. He represents the riding of Regina—Lewvan in the House of Commons as a Member of the Conservative Party.

Steinley serves as the Associate Shadow Minister for Agriculture, Agri-Food, and Food Security and he is also a member of the Standing Committee on Agriculture and Agri-Food.

Early life 
Warren grew up on a dairy and beef farm near Rush Lake, Saskatchewan. His family was very involved with the showing of Holstein cattle across Western Canada. The Steinley Brothers proudly exhibited animals as a family for decades, and the Park Lane prefix was a fixture on the dairy show circuits for decades.

Warren is a longtime athlete and sports enthusiast, and played competitive football, track and field, and hockey in his youth. Warren played in the Saskatchewan Senior Bowl for the top High School Graduating football players. After High School, He spent some time playing for the La Ronge Ice Wolves in the Saskatchewan Junior Hockey League.

Education and Career 
Steinley graduated with an Honours Degree in Political Science from the University of Regina, where he competed for the University of Regina Cougars Track and Field team. He also co-founded the local Saskatchewan Party Campus Club. After University, Warren completed an Internship with Hon. Gerry Ritz, the Minister of Agriculture in Ottawa and then worked in the office of Hon. Lynne Yelich, the Minister of Western Economic Diversification. Warren then returned to Saskatchewan in 2009 to work in the Saskatchewan Public Service within the Ministry of Executive Council as a Researcher. He served as the Director of Research within Government Caucus before being elected as an MLA in the 2011 Saskatchewan general election.

Steinley has been involved in numerous Saskatchewan Party and Conservative Party of Canada leadership races. He served as Andrew Scheer’s Saskatchewan leadership campaign chair in 2017, and co-chaired Erin O’Toole's successful 2020 leadership bid.

Member of Legislative Assembly
Steinley served as a Member of the Saskatchewan Legislative Assembly from 2011-2019 as the MLA for Regina Walsh-Acres. In addition to his duties as MLA, Steinley served as Deputy Caucus Chair, Chair of the Private Bills House Committee, member of the Standing Committee of Intergovernmental Affairs and Justice, and member of the Standing Committee of Human Services. Steinley was also a board member of Innovation Saskatchewan, the Provincial Capital Commission and served on the 2013 Grey Cup Executive Committee. 

Steinley was succeeded as MLA in 2020 by Derek Meyers.

2019 federal election
Steinley resigned his provincial seat on September 11, 2019, the same day the Writs of election were issued for the 2019 Canadian federal election. Saskatchewan's Premier Scott Moe subsequently indicated that a by-election would not be held to fill the resulting vacancy in the Legislature. He argued that it was in order to save the by-election expenses, and due to the proximity to the upcoming 2020 Saskatchewan provincial election.

Personal life 
In 2009 Warren married his wife Larissa. They have three young children. In 2018, Steinley obtained a Master’s Degree in Public Administration from the University of Regina through the Johnson Shoyama School of Public Policy.

Electoral record

Federal

Provincial

 

|-

|NDP
|Sandra Morin
|align="right"|2,488
|align="right"|39.34
|align="right"|-22.65

References

External links
 

Living people
Saskatchewan Party MLAs
Politicians from Regina, Saskatchewan
21st-century Canadian politicians
Conservative Party of Canada MPs
Members of the House of Commons of Canada from Saskatchewan
1982 births